The 2008 Montana gubernatorial election was held on November 4, 2008 to elect the governor and lieutenant governor of the U.S. state of Montana. Incumbent Governor Brian Schweitzer, a Democrat who was elected to his first four-year term in 2004, was elected to a second term with 65.5% of the vote. Incumbent Lieutenant Governor John Bohlinger, a Republican who was once again Schweitzer's running mate, was reelected to a second term. The Republican nominee was Roy Brown, a member of the Montana Senate. Brown's running mate was businessman Steve Daines, a future U.S. Representative and U.S. Senator.

Democratic primary

Candidates
 Brian Schweitzer, incumbent Governor of Montana, 2000 U.S. Senate nominee and rancher
 John Bohlinger, incumbent Lieutenant Governor of Montana and former Republican member of the Montana House of Representatives and Montana Senate
 William Fischer, small businessman involved in the logging industry in Lakeside, Montana
 Steve White, small business owner in the telecommunications industry in Kalispell, Montana
 Don Pogreba, Shelby native, English and debate teacher at Helena High School
 Jason Neiffer, Great Falls native, history teacher at Capital High School

Results

Republican primary

Candidates
 Roy Brown, businessman, member of the Montana Senate and former Majority Leader of the Montana House of Representatives
 Steve Daines, businessman
 Larry H. Steele, 2007 candidate for Mayor of Great Falls and 2006 candidate for the Montana House of Representatives
 Harold Luce

Primary results

Libertarian primary

Candidates
 Stan Jones, business consultant and United States Air Force veteran
 Michael Baker

General election

Predictions

Polling

Results

References

External links
Campaign contributions from Follow the Money
Brown (R) vs Schweitzer (D-i) graph of collected poll results from Pollster.com
Roy Brown for Governor 
Brian Schweitzer for Governor

2008
Montana
Gubernatorial